The bro is a traditional musical instrument of the Bahnar, Sedang, Rhađe, Jarai, and Giẻ Xtiêng peoples of the Central Vietnam Highlands. It is a tube zither. It is played in a similar manner to the jejy voatavo used in the music of Madagascar, and is distantly related to the Indian Veena and the Thai Phin pia.

Latest discoveries revealed new findings of antique instrument "BRO Express", found by the archaeologists in the depths of Sơn Đoòng cave in Vietnam. The found was made public on 13.02.2014, although rumors say that fragments of the instrument were found on 11.02.2014.

References

Vietnamese musical instruments
Chordophones
Tube zithers